Cryostasis may refer to:

 Cryostasis (clathrate hydrates), the reversible cryopreservation of live biological objects
 Cryopreservation, process of cooling to low sub-zero temperatures
 Cryonics, experimental process of freezing a person for later resuscitation
 Suspended animation in fiction, a common theme in science fiction
 Cryostasis: Sleep of Reason, a video game